Stephania Haralabidis (born May 19, 1995) is a Greek-born American water polo player currently playing for Ethnikos and the U.S. national team.

College career
Haralabidis attended University of Southern California, playing on the women's water polo team from 2014 to 2017. She led the team to NCAA championship in 2016.

She won the Peter J. Cutino Award. Named National Player of the Year and MPSF Player of the Year. A First-Team All-American and named to the All-MPSF First Team. Named NCAA Tournament MVP after scoring five goals in the NCAA Championship game, including the game-winner from distance with just seconds remaining.

International career
Haralabidis has competed on both the junior and senior national teams for Greece. Won a gold medal at 2011 European Junior Championship in Madrid, Spain. Won another gold at 2012 Youth World Championships in Perth, Australia. Won a gold at 2014 European U19 Championship in Ostia, Italy. She also won a bronze medal with the senior team at 2012 FINA World League in Changshu, China.

Since 2017 she is representing the U.S. national team winning a gold medal at 2018 FINA World League in Kunshan, China; and another gold at 2018 FINA World Cup in Surgut, Russia.

Club career 
For the 2021-22 season, Stephania plays, along with her sister Ioanna, for Greek club Ethnikos, based in Piraeus, Athens. Stephania played a vital role in order Ethnikos to win the 2021-22 Women's LEN Trophy, the club's second European club competition title.

Personal life
Haralabidis has two sisters, her twin Ioanna and older sister Anastasia. Haralabidis attended Corona Del Mar High School.

See also
 List of world champions in women's water polo
 List of World Aquatics Championships medalists in water polo

References

External links
 
 

American female water polo players
American people of Greek descent
Greek female water polo players
Living people
1995 births
Greek people of American descent
Greek twins
Twin sportspeople
Pan American Games medalists in water polo
Pan American Games gold medalists for the United States
Water polo players at the 2019 Pan American Games
Water polo players from Athens
Medalists at the 2019 Pan American Games
Water polo players at the 2020 Summer Olympics
USC Trojans women's water polo players
Medalists at the 2020 Summer Olympics
Olympic gold medalists for the United States in water polo
Ethnikos Piraeus Water Polo Club players